"Give Me My Freedom" is the debut single by Shillelagh Sisters, released in April 1984 by CBS. The group had some press coverage and also did some television shows (most notably The Tube) and a John Peel session at Radio One. The Shillelagh Sisters also went on tour as the supporting act for the rock band Spear of Destiny. However, all this promotion did not lead to pop success and their single charted poorly at No. 100 on the UK Singles Chart in May 1984.

Discography

References

1984 songs
1984 debut singles
CBS Records singles
Rockabilly songs